Adams Cup may refer to:

Adams Cup (ice hockey), an ice hockey trophy in the United States
Mrs. Charles Frances Adams Cup, a sailing trophy in the United States